Maxim Igorevich Zavozin (born March 2, 1985) is a former competitive ice dancer who appeared internationally for the United States and Hungary. With Nóra Hoffmann for Hungary, he is the 2010 Cup of Russia silver medalist and a two-time (2009, 2010) Hungarian national champion. With Morgan Matthews for the United States, he is the 2006 Four Continents silver medalist and 2005 World Junior champion.

Personal life 
Zavozin was born in Moscow, Russian SFSR, Soviet Union. He is the son of Soviet ice dancers Elena Garanina and Igor Zavozin. He competed in ballroom dancing in Russia from the age of 7 to 11. Zavozin's younger half-brother, Anton Spiridonov, currently represents the United States in ice dance with Lorraine McNamara.

Zavozin became a U.S. citizen on December 30, 2005. He became a Hungarian citizen on 25 January 2010, just before the 2010 Winter Olympics.

Career 
Zavozin first stepped onto the ice at the age of four but did not practice regularly due to extensive traveling. He stopped skating when he was seven and returned to it at 13. Early in his career, Zavozin competed with partner Stephanie Ellis.

Partnership with Matthews 
Zavozin teamed up with Morgan Matthews in 2001. They were coached by his mother, Elena Garanina, and Valeriy Spiridonov in Sunrise, Florida. They became the 2003 and 2004 U.S. junior champions and went on to capture the 2005 World Junior title. They won the pewter medal at the 2006 U.S. Championships and were sent to the 2006 Four Continents where they won silver. The next season, they placed fifth at the 2007 U.S. Championships. Matthews and Zavozin announced the end of their partnership on February 26, 2007.

Partnership with Hoffmann 
Zavozin teamed up with Hungarian Nóra Hoffmann in September 2007 to compete for Hungary. They had competed against each other at 2004 Junior Worlds.

During the 2008–09 season, Hoffmann/Zavozin did not compete on the Grand Prix circuit but won the 2009 Hungarian national title and were given a berth to the 2009 European Championships. Despite Zavozin having a fever, they skated in the original dance at Europeans, but his condition worsened and they had to withdraw before the free dance. They missed the 2009 World Championships due to a serious head injury to Hoffmann while training in the U.S. on March 4, 2009.

During the 2009–10 season, Hoffmann/Zavozin missed the Grand Prix series. They competed at the 2010 European Championships where they placed 10th. They qualified for the 2010 Olympics where they finished 13th. At the 2010 World Championships, they finished in 10th.

In the 2010–11 season, Hoffmann/Zavozin made their first appearance together on the Grand Prix series. Their first event was 2010 Cup of China where they placed fourth. At 2010 Cup of Russia, they won silver, their first medal on the senior Grand Prix series. They finished third in both the short and free dance and set personal best scores in both. They competed at the 2011 European Championships where they finished 8th after receiving some low levels from the technical panel and a small stumble. On March 30, 2011, Hoffmann was hospitalized. Hoffmann / Zavozin had to withdraw from the 2011 World Championships. They did not compete in the 2011–12 season but said in March 2012 that they were considering returning to competition.

Programs

With Hoffmann

With Matthews

Competitive highlights 
GP: Grand Prix; JGP: Junior Grand Prix

With Hoffmann for Hungary

With Matthews for the United States

With Ellis for the United States

References

External links 

 
 
 

1985 births
American male ice dancers
Hungarian male ice dancers
Figure skaters at the 2010 Winter Olympics
Olympic figure skaters of Hungary
Living people
Figure skaters from Moscow
Russian emigrants to the United States
Naturalized citizens of Hungary
Four Continents Figure Skating Championships medalists
World Junior Figure Skating Championships medalists
People from Ashburn, Virginia